Eric Kwame Adjei (born September 12, 1984, in Tema, Ghana) is a Ghanaian footballer who plays as a midfielder for SK Roudnice nad Labem.

He played domestically for F.C. Ever Green, F.C. Okyeman, F.C. Arsalah, F.C. Supreme, F.C. Tema and Great Olympics, in Italy for San Gennaro Calcio, in Austria for TSV Hartberg, and in the Czech Republic for Bohemians Prague (Střížkov), SK Roudnice nad Labem and FC Chomutov.

References

External links
 Profile & Stats

1984 births
Living people
Ghanaian footballers
Expatriate footballers in Italy
Association football defenders
Expatriate footballers in Austria
People from Tema
Czech First League players
FK Bohemians Prague (Střížkov) players
Expatriate footballers in the Czech Republic
Accra Great Olympics F.C. players
Ghanaian expatriate sportspeople in Austria
Ghanaian expatriate sportspeople in the Czech Republic
Ghanaian expatriate sportspeople in Italy